Baron Berend-Jan Marie van Voorst tot Voorst (born 7 February 1944) is a retired Dutch politician and diplomat of the Christian Democratic Appeal (CDA) party and jurist.

Van Voorst tot Voorst worked as a civil servant for the Ministry of Foreign Affairs from July 1968 until September 1972 and as a diplomat for the Directorate-General for External Relations of the European Commission in Brussels from September 1972 until May 1985. Van Voorst tot Voorst worked as a civil servant for the Ministry of Economic Affairs as Director-General of the department for Foreign Trade from May 1985 until September 1988. Van Voorst tot Voorst was appointed as State Secretary for Foreign Affairs in the Cabinet Lubbers II following the resignation of René van der Linden, taking office on 27 september 1988. Van Voorst tot Voorst was elected as a Member of the House of Representatives after the election of 1989, taking office on 14 September 1989. Following the cabinet formation of 1989 Van Voorst tot Voorst was appointed as State Secretary for Defence in the Cabinet Lubbers III, taking office on 7 November 1989. 

In June 1993 Van Voorst tot Voorst was nominated as Queen's Commissioner of Limburg, he resigned as a State Secretary on 1 June 1993 and was installed as Queen's Commissioner, serving from 1 July 1993 until 1 July 2005.

Personal
Berend-Jan van Voorst tot Voorst had his secondary education in Tilburg and studied law at the Catholic University of Nijmegen and politics as well as science at the University of Fribourg Switzerland).

Van Voorst tot Voorst is married and has 3 daughters.

Decorations

References

External links

Official
  Mr. B.J.M. (Berend-Jan) baron van Voorst tot Voorst Parlement & Politiek

1944 births
Living people
Berend-Jan
Catholic People's Party politicians
Christian Democratic Appeal politicians
Commanders of the Order of Leopold II
Commanders of the Order of Orange-Nassau
Commandeurs of the Légion d'honneur
Dutch corporate directors
Dutch expatriates in Belgium
Dutch expatriates in Malta
Dutch expatriates in Switzerland
Dutch nonprofit directors
Dutch nonprofit executives
Dutch officials of the European Union
Dutch Roman Catholics
King's and Queen's Commissioners of Limburg
Knights Commander of the Order of St Gregory the Great
Knights of Malta
Knights of the Holy Sepulchre
Knights of the Order of the Netherlands Lion
Recipients of the Order pro Merito Melitensi
Members of the House of Representatives (Netherlands)
Politicians from Maastricht
People from Ubbergen
Radboud University Nijmegen alumni
State Secretaries for Defence of the Netherlands
State Secretaries for Foreign Affairs of the Netherlands
University of Fribourg alumni
20th-century Dutch civil servants
20th-century Dutch diplomats
20th-century Dutch jurists
20th-century Dutch politicians
21st-century Dutch businesspeople
21st-century Dutch diplomats
21st-century Dutch jurists
21st-century Dutch politicians